Scavenger receptor cysteine rich family member with 4 domains is a protein that in humans is encoded by the SSC4D gene.

Function

The scavenger receptor cysteine-rich (SRCR) superfamily is an ancient and highly conserved group of cell surface and/or secreted proteins, some of which are involved in the development of the immune system and the regulation of both innate and adaptive immune responses. Group B SRCR domains usually contain 8 regularly spaced cysteines that give rise to a well-defined intradomain disulfide-bond pattern.

References

Further reading